Rustler Peak is a summit in the U.S. state of Oregon.

Rustler Peak was named for the fact cattle rustlers once operated in the area.

References

Mountains of Jackson County, Oregon
Mountains of Oregon